Rodrigo Adeildo Souza Silva, known as Rodrigo Cabeça, (ホドリゴ・カベッサ | born January 14, 1992) is a Brazilian football player for Kataller Toyama.

Club statistics
Updated to 23 February 2017.

References

External links

Profile at Kataller Toyama

1992 births
Living people
Brazilian footballers
Brazilian expatriate footballers
Expatriate footballers in Japan
J2 League players
J3 League players
Matsumoto Yamaga FC players
Kataller Toyama players
Association football forwards
People from Santo André, São Paulo
Footballers from São Paulo (state)